Following is a list of senators of Hérault, people who have represented the department of Hérault in the Senate of France.

Third Republic

Senators for Hérault under the French Third Republic were:

 Eustache Bonafous (1876–1879)
 Marie Théophile (Rodez-Benavent) (1876–1879)
 Jules Pagézy (1876–1879)
 Jean Bazille (1879–1888)
 Charles Griffe (1879–1895)
 Jean Combescure (1879–1897)
 Eugène Lisbonne (1888–1891)
 Jean Galtier (1891–1904)
 Élisée Déandréis (1895–1906)
 Ernest Perréal (1897–1906)
 Jules Razimbaud (1904–1915)
 Casimir Delhon (1906–1920)
 Louis Nègre (1906–1920)
 Louis Lafferre (1920–1924)
 Paul Pelisse (1920–1938)
 Marius Roustan (1920–1940)
 Camille Reboul (1924–1939)
 Pierre Masse (1939–1940)
 Auguste Albertini (1939–1940)

Fourth Republic

Senators for Hérault under the French Fourth Republic were:

 Joseph Aussel (1946–1948)
 Joseph Lazare (1946–1948)
 Jean Bène (1946–1959)
 Édouard Barthe (1948–1949)
 Émile Claparède (1948–1959)
 Jean Péridier (1949–1959)

Fifth Republic 
Senators for Hérault under the French Fifth Republic:

References

Sources

 
Lists of members of the Senate (France) by department